Marc Rosset defeated Jan Siemerink 6–2, 7–6(7–1) to win the 1993 Open 13 singles event.

Seeds

  Ivan Lendl (second round)
  Sergi Bruguera (quarterfinals)
  Henrik Holm (semifinals)
  Amos Mansdorf (second round)
  Arnaud Boetsch (quarterfinals)
  Marc Rosset (champion)
  Jakob Hlasek (semifinals)
  Jan Siemerink (final)

Draws

Final

Section 1

Section 2

References

External links
 Main draw

Open 13 - Singles, 1993
Open 13